Truncatella pulchella  is a species of very small land snail that lives at the edge of the sea, a gastropod mollusk in the family Truncatellidae. This species lives on coastlines in the tropical western Atlantic.

Distribution
The distribution of this species includes: 
 Florida
 Caribbean coast of Mexico
 Bermuda
 Bahamas
 Cuba
 Jamaica
 Puerto Rico
 Virgin Islands
 Brazil

Description 
The maximum recorded shell length is 6.5 mm.

Habitat 
The minimum recorded depth for this species is 0 m, and the maximum recorded depth is 0 m.

References

External links 
 Truncatella pulchella. Malacolog.

Truncatellidae
Molluscs of the Atlantic Ocean
Taxa named by Ludwig Karl Georg Pfeiffer
Gastropods described in 1839